Évelyne Didi is a French actress. She has appeared in more than thirty films since 1978.

Selected filmography

References

External links
 

Living people
French film actresses
French television actresses
Year of birth missing (living people)
French stage actresses
20th-century French actresses
21st-century French actresses